"A Shadow of the Past" is the first episode of the first season of the American fantasy television series The Lord of the Rings: The Rings of Power, based on the novel The Lord of the Rings and its appendices by J. R. R. Tolkien. Set in the Second Age of Middle-earth, thousands of years before Tolkien's The Hobbit and The Lord of the Rings, it follows a large cast of characters during a peaceful time. The episode was written by showrunners J. D. Payne and Patrick McKay, and directed by J. A. Bayona.

Amazon made a multi-season commitment for a new The Lord of the Rings series in November 2017. Payne and McKay were set to develop it in July 2018, and Bayona was hired to direct the first two episodes a year later. The first episode introduces some of the key characters, relationships, and groups for the series, such as Morfydd Clark's Galadriel. Her characterization is depicted differently from The Lord of the Rings and was shaped by Tolkien's notes on the character's backstory. Harfoots, precursors to the popular Hobbit race from The Hobbit and The Lord of the Rings, are also introduced in the episode. Filming for the first season began in New Zealand in February 2020, but was placed on hold in March due to the COVID-19 pandemic. Production resumed in September and wrapped for the first two episodes by the end of December.

"A Shadow of the Past" premiered on the streaming service Amazon Prime Video on September 1, 2022. Along with the second episode it had the most viewers of any Prime Video premiere within 24 hours, and received generally positive reviews.

Plot 
The Elf Galadriel grew up in Valinor during a time of peace. When the two trees that lit the world were destroyed by the Dark Lord Morgoth, the Elves sailed across the Sundering Seas to Middle-earth and waged a devastating war against him that lasted for centuries. After Morgoth was defeated, his Orcs continued to spread around the world led by his servant Sauron, a powerful sorcerer. Galadriel's brother Finrod died hunting Sauron, and Galadriel vowed to continue the search.

Thousands of years later, Galadriel and a company of Elves discover an abandoned fortress in the northern wastelands of Forodwaith. They find evidence of black magic and an anvil bearing Sauron's mark. Galadriel believes this is part of a trail left for Orcs to follow. The company are attacked by a snow-troll and sustain injuries before it is killed by Galadriel. She commands that they continue the search north, but the others refuse and she reluctantly returns to the Elven capital of Lindon.

In the wilderlands of Rhovanion in the east of Middle-earth, a community of nomadic Harfoots—small, secretive beings—are surprised to see human hunters passing nearby at an uncommon time of year. Harfoot elder Sadoc Burrows also believes the stars are appearing when they should not. A group of young Harfoots, including Nori Brandyfoot and Poppy Proudfellow, go to a nearby farm to eat berries but they return to camp when they discover wolf footprints.

Galadriel meets with her friend Elrond, the herald and speech-writer for High King Gil-galad, in Lindon. Gil-galad proclaims the war to be over and grants Galadriel's company the great honor of sailing across the sea to Valinor where they can live an eternal life at peace. Galadriel intends to turn down this offer, but Elrond convinces her that it is time to stop fighting. He later talks to Gil-galad, who has foreseen that Galadriel's search for Sauron could help the latter endure. Gil-galad introduces Elrond to a great Elven-smith, Lord Celebrimbor, who is beginning an important new project that Gil-galad wants Elrond to help with.

Word that the war is over reaches a group of Elves in the Southlands of Middle-earth who have been watching over Tirharad, a village of Men descended from allies of Morgoth. One of the Elves, Arondir, has grown close with the human healer Bronwyn and is with her when a villager arrives with a sick cow. It had wandered to the nearby village of Hordern, and when Arondir and Bronwyn investigate that town they find it in flames. Meanwhile, Bronwyn's son Theo finds a broken sword bearing Sauron's mark.

Across the Sundering Seas, Galadriel and her company prepare to enter Valinor which appears as a great light. Galadriel has second thoughts about abandoning her search for Sauron and jumps from the ship. At the same time, a meteor flies across Middle-earth and crashes near the Harfoots' camp. Nori finds a strange man in the crater.

Production

Development 
Amazon acquired the global television rights for J. R. R. Tolkien's The Lord of the Rings in November 2017. The company's streaming service, Amazon Prime Video, gave a multi-season commitment to a series based on the novel and its appendices, to be produced by Amazon Studios. It was later titled The Lord of the Rings: The Rings of Power. Amazon hired J. D. Payne and Patrick McKay to develop the series and serve as showrunners in July 2018, and J. A. Bayona was hired to direct the first two episodes a year later. The series is set in the Second Age of Middle-earth, thousands of years before the events of Tolkien's The Hobbit and The Lord of the Rings, and the first season focuses on introducing the setting and major heroic characters to the audience. In February 2022, Bayona revealed the title for the first episode, "A Shadow of the Past", which comes from the second chapter of The Lord of the Rings, "The Shadow of the Past". McKay said the first season was influenced by dialogue from that chapter which he paraphrased as "After a defeat and a respite, a shadow grows again in a new form."

Writing 
Payne and McKay felt it was essential to establish relationships in the first episode that the audience could invest in, such as the Romeo and Juliet-style love story between the Elf Arondir and the human Brownyn, the hijinks-filled friendship between the young Harfoots Nori Brandyfoot and Poppy Proudfellow, and the respectful relationship between the Elves Galadriel and Elrond who McKay described as "almost peers, but not quite".

The showrunners chose to begin the series with an "intimate" flashback sequence showing a young Galadriel and her brother Finrod talking under a tree. McKay said this was a conscious choice to subvert expectations for the "vast and incredible epic" that they felt audiences would be expecting. The rest of the episode features an older Galadriel, though one who is still much younger than she is in The Lord of the Rings. To approach a young character who is actually centuries old, actress Morfydd Clark felt that naivete would show in Elves as arrogance, and said there was an "innocence to [Galadriel's] arrogance" which she based on a quote from the character about "how with gaining wisdom, there's a loss of innocence". McKay said when Finrod walks away from Galadriel in the flashback it represents "a little piece of innocence [that] seems to be going away from her".

Galadriel's characterization in the series differs from the "elder stateswoman" that she is portrayed as in The Lord of the Rings, to allow the series to show her journey to becoming like that. The writers instead looked to Tolkien's notes about Galadriel in her youth, such as one describing her as being a strong fighter of "Amazon disposition". The episode ends with a key decision for the character in which she chooses to hunt for the Dark Lord Sauron in Middle-earth rather than enter the land of Valinor to live an eternal life at peace. Tolkien did not explain why Galadriel chose to remain in Middle-earth in his writings, though he considered several reasons including her pride, choosing to remain with her husband, or being banned from Valinor for an unknown reason. This gave the writers leeway to create their own reason, which is Galadriel choosing to continue Finrod's hunt for Sauron after the former's death. Clark compared this to the Welsh word hiraeth which she called "a yearning and longing", something she felt Galadriel has for Valinor but more so for "finishing what she was meant to do".

Each group of characters in the series is introduced at "a time of enormous change in their worlds" which the showrunners hoped would help make the series "dramatic and surprising". This includes the Harfoots, who have "rules for what they do and don't do". They are depicted as precursors to the popular Hobbit race from The Hobbit and The Lord of the Rings, and were included because the showrunners felt the series would not truly feel like Middle-earth to the audience without Hobbits or characters that were "satisfyingly Hobbit-adjacent". The episode ends with a mysterious being landing "quite literally in [their] backyard", which executive producer Lindsey Weber said was one of the foundational ideas of the series for the showrunners. She said the stranger had "many layers" to reveal and hoped Tolkien fans would enjoy learning about him throughout the season.

Casting 

The series' large cast includes Robert Aramayo as Elrond, Nazanin Boniadi as Bronwyn, Morfydd Clark as Galadriel, Ismael Cruz Córdova as Arondir, Charles Edwards as Celebrimbor, Lenny Henry as Sadoc Burrows, Markella Kavenagh as Elanor "Nori" Brandyfoot, Tyroe Muhafidin as Theo, Megan Richards as Poppy Proudfellow, Dylan Smith as Largo Brandyfoot, Benjamin Walker as Gil-galad, Daniel Weyman as the stranger, and Sara Zwangobani as Marigold Brandyfoot. Also starring are Amelie Child-Villiers as young Galadriel, Will Fletcher as Finrod, Fabian McCallum as Thondir, Kip Chapman as Rían, Thusitha Jayasundera as Malva, Maxine Cunliffe as Vilma, Beau Cassidy as Dilly Brandyfoot, Geoff Morrell as Waldreg, Peter Tait as Tredwill, Ian Blackburn as Rowan, Augustus Prew as Médhor, and Simon Merrells as Revion.

Filming 
Amazon confirmed in September 2019 that filming for the first season would take place in New Zealand, where the Lord of the Rings and Hobbit film trilogies were made. Filming began in early February, primarily at Kumeu Film Studios and Auckland Film Studios in Auckland, under the working title Untitled Amazon Project or simply UAP. Óscar Faura was the director of photography for the first two episodes, after serving the same role on all of Bayona's previous films. Location filming took place around Auckland in February. Filming for the first two episodes was expected to continue through May, but was placed on hold in mid-March 2020 due to the COVID-19 pandemic. The majority of filming for the first two episodes was reportedly completed by then. Filming resumed on September 28, and Bayona completed filming for his episodes by December 23.

Visual effects 
Visual effects for the episode were created by Industrial Light & Magic (ILM), Wētā FX, Method Studios, Rodeo FX, Cause and FX, Atomic Arts, and Cantina Creative. The different vendors were overseen by visual effects supervisor Jason Smith. The origami boat that young Galadriel makes during the opening flashback was created by the series' practical effects team and filmed for real. The establishing shot of Tirion, a city in Valinor, was one of the first visual effects shots worked on for the series. McKay felt the completed shot was "pretty spectacular", and it became the first image to be released for the series.

Wētā created the abandoned fortress that Galadriel and her company explore, as well as the snow-troll that they fight inside the fortress. When creating the digital model of the troll, Smith said the visual effects team considered questions such as "Why is that troll there? What does he do? How healthy or not is he? How old is he? How long has he been there?" The face and head of the troll were based on a sketch by illustrator John Howe, who was one of the main conceptual designers on the film trilogies. Howe did six or seven different sketches of the troll and said it came from various inspirations over time, including his work on other trolls for the films. A frozen waterfall seen in the episode was based on photography of a real frozen waterfall at Wye Creek in the South Island of New Zealand. A part of the waterfall was created practically out of wax and snow resin for filming.

Music 

A soundtrack album featuring composer Bear McCreary's score for the episode was released on Amazon Music on September 1, 2022. McCreary said the album contained "virtually every second of score" from the episode. It was added to other music streaming services after the full first season was released. All music composed by Bear McCreary:

Release 
"A Shadow of the Past" premiered on Prime Video in the United States on September 1, 2022. It was released at the same time around the world, in more than 240 countries and territories.

Reception

Viewership 
Amazon announced that The Rings of Power had been watched by 25 million viewers globally in the first 24 hours that the first two episodes were available on Prime Video. The company stated that this was the biggest premiere ever for the service. It did not specify how much of an episode a user needed to watch to count as a viewer. Analytics company Samba TV, which gathers viewership data from certain Smart TVs and content providers, reported that 1.8 million U.S. households watched the first episode within four days of its release. Whip Media, who track viewership data for the 21 million worldwide users of their TV Time app, calculated that for the week ending September 4, three days after the episode's debut, it was the second-highest original streaming series for U.S. viewership. Nielsen Media Research, who record streaming viewership on U.S. television screens, estimated that The Rings of Power was watched for 1.25 billion minutes during its first four days. This is around 12.6 million viewers, the most for any streaming series or film for the week ending September 4.

Critical response 

The review aggregator website Rotten Tomatoes reported an 84% approval rating with an average score of 7.4/10 based on 156 reviews. The website's critics consensus reads: "Forging its claim with astounding production value, vast scope and a dense—arguably impenetrable—amount of lore, 'A Shadow of the Past' suggests that this ambitious expansion of Tolkien's opus has a bright future."

Accolades 
The episode was included in the television series competition at the 2022 Camerimage festival, attributed to Bayona and Faura, but did not win the award. Costume designer Kate Hawley was nominated for Excellence in Sci-Fi/Fantasy Television at the 2022 Costume Designers Guild Awards for her work on this episode.

Companion media 
An episode of the official aftershow Deadline's Inside the Ring: LOTR: The Rings of Power for "A Shadow of the Past" was released on September 3, 2022. Hosted by Deadline Hollywood Dominic Patten and Anthony D'Alessandro, it features exclusive "footage and insights" for the episode, plus interviews with cast members Clark, Aramayo, Walker, and Edwards, as well as executive producers McKay, Payne, and Weber. On October 14, The Official The Lord of the Rings: The Rings of Power Podcast was released on Amazon Music. Hosted by actress Felicia Day, the first episode is dedicated to "A Shadow of the Past" and features Clark, Payne, and McKay. On November 21, a bonus segment featuring behind-the-scenes footage from the episode was added to Prime Video's X-Ray feature as part of a series titled "The Making of The Rings of Power".

References

External links 
 

2022 American television episodes
The Lord of the Rings: The Rings of Power